Stanislas Dombeck (26 September 1931 – 18 September 2013) was a French footballer who played at both professional and international levels as a midfielder and forward.

Career
Born in Crisenoy, Dombeck played professionally for Amiens, Stade Français and Rennes. After playing amateur football, he became manager of Tours.

He made one international appearance for France, in 1958.

Later life and death
He died on 18 September 2013, at the age of 81.

References

1931 births
2013 deaths
French footballers
France international footballers
Amiens SC players
Stade Français (association football) players
Stade Rennais F.C. players
Ligue 1 players
Ligue 2 players
Association football midfielders
Association football forwards
French football managers
Tours FC managers